Todor Nedyalkov Diev (28 January 1934 – 6 January 1995) was a Bulgarian footballer, part of the Bulgarian squad that won the bronze medals in the 1956 Summer Olympics in Melbourne.

Career
Diev began his career at the local Spartak Plovdiv. He made his professional debut in 1950 and since then he played in 308 matches and scored 146 goals. He had a brief period in Spartak Sofia in 1952–1953. He won the Bulgarian A Professional Football Group in 1963 and the Soviet Army Cup in 1958. Diev was crowned as championship top scorer for three times in 1955, 1962 and 1963. He is one of the legends of Spartak Plovdiv. He was recognized as all-time best player of the club.

Todor made his international debut on 13 November 1955, when he scored a goal against Czechoslovakia in a 3–0 win in Sofia. He was capped 55 times for Bulgaria national team and scored 16 goals. Diev played for the team in 1962 FIFA World Cup in Chile and won a bronze medal in the 1956 Summer Olympics in Melbourne. His most remarkable goal was against Brazil on 18 May 1958 at Estádio do Morumbi. After the match, he received an offer for transfer in Brazilian club, but he refused. Diev was team captain since 20 December 1964 to his retirement. His last international match was against Belgium on 27 October 1965, Bulgaria lost 5–0 in Brussels.

Honours
 Spartak Plovdiv (1953–1966)
Bulgarian A PFG: 1962–63
 Soviet Army Cup: 1958
 Bulgaria (1955–1965)
 Summer Olympics Tournament Bronze Medal 1956

Individual
Bulgarian A PFG: 1955, 1962, 1963
 Honored Master of Sports: 1960

References

1934 births
1995 deaths
Bulgarian footballers
Bulgaria international footballers
FC Spartak Plovdiv players
First Professional Football League (Bulgaria) players
1962 FIFA World Cup players
Footballers at the 1952 Summer Olympics
Footballers at the 1956 Summer Olympics
Footballers at the 1960 Summer Olympics
Olympic footballers of Bulgaria
Olympic bronze medalists for Bulgaria
Olympic medalists in football
Footballers from Plovdiv
Medalists at the 1956 Summer Olympics
Association football forwards
Association football midfielders